Multireticula is a genus of the family Tephritidae.

References

Tephritinae
Tephritidae genera